The Tavistock Braves are a Junior ice hockey team based in Tavistock, Ontario, Canada.  They currently play in the Provincial Junior Hockey League of the Ontario Hockey Association.

History
During the 1981-82 season Tavistock finished first overall in regular season league play for the first time in franchise history.  In 1982-83 the feat was repeated and was upstaged with the first and only OHA Cup in franchise history.  In 1986-87 and 1987-88 Tavistock would once again post back-to-back first overall regular season finishes.  However, in both seasons they would fall short of the OHA Cup.

After suffering relative mediocrity through the 1990s Tavistock would return as a power in the 2000s. In the early 2000s Tavistock was consistently held just short of a championship by a pair of Hawks.  Both Exeter and Hagersville took turns ending Tavistock's postseason runs a little earlier than expected.

As the decade progressed Tavistock would encounter a new rival. In the spring of 2006 the Delhi Travellers would be responsible for eliminating the Braves in the conference finals in four games. In 2006-07 Tavistock finished first place overall during the regular season.  The league's top two scorers, Jeff Roes and Joe Voll played for the Tavistock Braves during the 06-07 season, Voll set a team and conference record tallying 122 points in 42 games. However come playoff time the Braves again found themselves in a battle for the conference title with Delhi. This time falling short in a dramatic game seven double overtime loss.  In 2007-08 Tavistock would again meet the rival Travellers in the McConnell Conference final, however unlike the previous two years the Braves managed to come back from a 3-1 series deficit to take the Conference title.  Twenty-five years after their previous OHA Cup Championship the Braves were unable to duplicate the accomplishment and fell to a strong Thamesford Trojans team in four games.

With the restructuring of the Southern Ontario Junior Hockey League for the 2008-09 season Tavistock found themselves in a conference with longtime local rivals the Ayr Centennials and Wellesley Applejacks as well as a newly formed foe in Thamesford.  Due to an imbalanced schedule Tavistock and Thamesford would play each other eight times during the regular season. The two heavy weights of the division battled it out for the conference title until January when Thamesford began to pull away.  As expected the two teams breezed through their first rounds and met up in the conference finals.  Tavistock came out with the short end of the stick losing an extremely close series four games to one with no games were decided by more than a goal.

In the Summer of 2013, the Ontario Hockey Association realigned and the Braves ended up in the Midwestern Junior C Hockey League.

For the 2016-17 season the eight Ontario Junior "C" hockey leagues amalgamated into one league, the Provincial Junior Hockey League. The Midwestern League was placed in the South Conference and re-branded the Pat Doherty division.

Season-by-season standings

Playoffs
1983 Won league, Won OHA Championship
Tavistock Braves defeated St. George Dukes 4-games-to-2 in OHA final

Notable alumni
Jeff Zehr played for the Tavistock Braves during the 1993/94 season.

External links
Braves Homepage

Southern Ontario Junior Hockey League teams